DDX may refer to:

 , a common notation for the differential operator with respect to a variable x
 DD(X), former program name of a class of U.S. Navy destroyers
 Differential diagnosis (DDx or D/Dx), a systematic method used to identify unknowns
 Device Dependent X, graphics device drivers supporting 2D acceleration in the X.Org Server
 DDX (chemistry), a collective name for DDT and its breakdown products DDE and DDD

See also
 3DDX, a rhythm video game
 DXD (disambiguation)